Albert Cooke (11 April 1908 – 1988) was an English footballer who played as a wing half for Rochdale, Notts County (reserves), Hull City and Halifax Town.

References

Rochdale A.F.C. players
Notts County F.C. players
Hull City A.F.C. players
Halifax Town A.F.C. players
Monckton Athletic F.C. players
Scunthorpe United F.C. players
People from Royston, South Yorkshire
1908 births
1988 deaths
English footballers
Association football midfielders